"Wishes" is a song by Human Nature, released as the third single from their album Telling Everybody. The song peaked at No. 6 in Australia, becoming their first top ten single.

Track listing

Australian single
 "Wishes" (written by: Alan Glass & Andrew Klippel)
 "Last Christmas" (written by: George Michael)
 "You Know" (written by: Michael Tierney, Andrew Tierney & Paul Begaud)
 "Wishes II" (written by: Alan Glass & Andrew Klippel)

European single
 "Wishes"
 "You Know" (written by: Michael Tierney, Andrew Tierney & Paul Begaud)

UK single
 "Wishes" (album version) – 4:04
 "Wishes" (Carl Mcintosh's R & B Mix) – 4:32
 "Wishes" (Carl Mcintosh's Urban Alternative Mix) – 4:17
 "Wishes" (Ak's Comfort Zone Mix) – 4:54
 "Wishes" (a cappella) – 3:49

Charts

Weekly charts
"Wishes" debuted at No. 43 in Australia in the week commencing October 27, 1996, before rising to a peak of No. 6 on January 12, 1997.

Year-end charts

Sales and certifications

Awards
"Wishes" was nominated for an ARIA music award at the 1997 ceremony. It lost to "Truly Madly Deeply" by Savage Garden.

|-
|1997
| "Wishes"
|Highest Selling Single
| 
|-
|}

References

External links

1996 singles
Human Nature (band) songs
1996 songs
Sony Music Australia singles
Songs written by Andrew Klippel
Pop ballads